Nippes may refer to:

 Nippes, Haiti
 Nippes, Cologne, a district of Cologne, Germany
 Grande Rivière de Nippes, a Haitian river also known as the Nippes River
 A. S. Nippes, the initial manufacturer of the Sharps rifle